Ralph Joseph Barahona (born November 16, 1965) is an American former professional ice hockey center who played six games in the National Hockey League for the Boston Bruins.  He scored two goals and two assists for four points in his brief NHL career. Prior to the NHL, Barahona played at the University of Wisconsin Stevens Point where he won two National Championships in 1989 and 1990.

Both of Barahona's two NHL goals came in the same game.  On February 3, 1991, Barahona scored Boston's final two goals in his team's 6-3 victory over the Pittsburgh Penguins at Boston Garden.

Career statistics

Regular season and playoffs

External links
 

1965 births
American men's ice hockey centers
Anaheim Bullfrogs players
Bakersfield Condors (1998–2015) players
Boston Bruins players
Cincinnati Cyclones (IHL) players
Fort Wayne Komets players
Hampton Roads Admirals players
Ice hockey players from California
Living people
Long Beach Ice Dogs (WCHL) players
Los Angeles Blades players
Maine Mariners players
People from Lakewood, California
Phoenix Cobras players
Phoenix Mustangs players
Raleigh IceCaps players
San Diego Barracudas players
San Diego Gulls (WCHL) players
San Jose Rhinos players
Sportspeople from Long Beach, California
Undrafted National Hockey League players
Utica Devils players
Wisconsin–Stevens Point Pointers men's ice hockey players